Geest is a type of sandy heathland common in northern Europe, especially in North Germany, Denmark and the Netherlands.

Geest may also refer to:

People 
 Dennis van der Geest (born 1975), Dutch judoka
 Elco van der Geest (born 1979), Dutch-born Belgian judoka
 Frank van der Geest (born 1973), Dutch football goalkeeper
 Wybrand de Geest (1592–1661), Dutch painter
 Jack van der Geest (1923–2009), escaped WWII Resistance member
 Gerrit De Geest (born 1960), Belgian scholar
 Willy De Geest (born 1947), Belgian cyclist

Other uses 
 Geest (brand), a British banana import and food manufacturing company

See also 
 Geeste (disambiguation)